Karol Kuzmány (16 November 1806 in Brezno – 14 August 1866 in Štubnianske Teplice) was a prominent Slovak Lutheran pastor, writer, and theologian in the Kingdom of Hungary, with a focus on philosophy and aesthetics. He studied at the University of Jena in Germany between 1928 and 1929. He returned to Slovakia after his education and became a chaplain in Banská Bystrica in 1830, later serving as a pastor there and in Zvolen. In 1849 he became professor of practical theology at the University of Vienna and began to publish works on theology. In 1860 he was elected superintendent (an ecclesiastical position equivalent in the Lutheran church to that of bishop), serving the Bratislava superintendency.

Kuzmány was a co-founder and vice-president of the Slovak League. The group, which promoted Slovak culture and learning during the time of the Austro-Hungarian Empire, first met in 1863. As vice-president, Kuzmány was responsible for directing the group's activities, a responsibility he maintained through 1870. He worked to improve the legal status of both Lutherans and Slovaks in the Empire.

Kuzmány is buried at the National Cemetery in Martin. His likeness appears on a Slovakian postage stamp and a Europa Coin from 2006.

References

Bibliography 

  
  
  
  

1806 births
1866 deaths
People from Brezno
Slovak religious leaders
19th-century Slovak writers
Slovak Lutherans
Lutheran bishops in Europe
Burials at National Cemetery in Martin